Sataf (Arabic: صطاف, Hebrew: סטף) was a Palestinian village in the Jerusalem Subdistrict depopulated during the 1948 Arab–Israeli War. It was located 10 km west of Jerusalem, with Sorek Valley (Arabic: Wadi as-Sarar) bordering to the east.

Two springs, Ein Sataf and Ein Bikura flow from the site into the riverbed below.

A monastery located across the valley from Sataf, i.e. south of Wadi as-Sarar, known by local Arabs as Ein el-Habis (the "Spring of the Hermitage"), is officially called Monastery of Saint John in the Wilderness.

Today it is  a tourist site showcasing ancient agricultural techniques used in the Jerusalem Mountains.

History

Chalcolithic period
Remains of a 4,000 BCE Chalcolithic village were discovered at the site. The related  traces of agricultural activities number among the oldest in the region.

Byzantine period
Most ancient remains date to the Byzantine period.

Mamluk period
The first written mention of the site is from the Mamluk era.

Ottoman period
Sataf was noted in the  Ottoman tax records of 1525-1526 and  1538–1539,  as being located in the Sanjak of Al-Quds.  According to archaeological work, the village originated in the late 16th  century, with the use of several cave−dwellings. Later, houses were erected in front of the caves.

In  1838  it was described as a Muslim  village,   located in the Beni Hasan district, west of Jerusalem.

In 1863, Victor Guérin found a village of one hundred and eighty people. He further noted that their houses were standing on the slopes of a mountain, and that the mountainside was covered by  successive terraces. An Ottoman village list from about 1870  counted 38 houses and a population of  115, whereby  only men were counted.

In 1883,  the Palestine Exploration Fund's Survey of Western Palestine described  Setaf  as "a village of moderate size, of stone houses, perched on the steep side of a valley. It has a spring lower down, on the north."

In 1896 the population of Sataf  was estimated to be about 180 persons.

British Mandate period
By the 1922 census of Palestine conducted by the British Mandate authorities, Sataf  had a population of 329;  321  Muslims and 8 Christians. All the Christians were  Roman Catholic. The 1931 census  lists 381 inhabitants; 379 Muslim and 2 Christian, in a total of 101 houses.

In the 1945 statistics  the population of Sataf  was   540, all  Muslims,  and the total land area was 3,775  dunams,  according to an official land and population survey.  Of this, 928  dunams were plantations and irrigable land,  465 for cereals, while 22 dunams were built-up land.

1948, aftermath
On July 13–14, 1948 the Arab village was depopulated by the Har'el Brigade, during Operation Danny.

Sataf and the surrounding area became part of the newly created State of Israel. A short time after the 1948 War, a small group of Jewish immigrants from North Africa settled for a few months in the village area. Subsequently, the IDF's Unit 101 and paratroopers used it for training purposes.

In the 1980s the Jewish National Fund began the restoration of ancient agricultural terraces, and the area around the springs has been turned into a tourist site. A forest around the site was also planted by the Jewish National Fund.

In 1992, Sataf was described as follows: "Many half-destroyed  walls still stand, and some still have  arched doorways. The walls of a few houses with collapsed roofs are almost intact....The area around the village spring, which is located to the east next to the ruins of a rectangular stone house, has been turned into an Israeli tourist site. A Jewish family has settled on the west side of the village, and have fenced in some of the village area."

Shrine of 'Ubayd
The shrine (maqam) of 'Ubayd, southwest of the village site, contains a courtyard and three rooms. According to Tawfiq Canaan, Sheikh 'Ubayd "is said to kill any goat or sheep who enters his cave."

Gallery

References

Bibliography

External links
Welcome To Sataf in Palestineremembered.com
Sataf, from Zochrot
Survey of Western Palestine, Map 17:  IAA, Wikimedia commons 
Map, 1946

Arab villages depopulated during the 1948 Arab–Israeli War
District of Jerusalem
Archaeological sites in Israel
Springs of Israel